Pseudomonas sRNA P1 is a ncRNA that was predicted using bioinformatic tools in the genome of the opportunistic pathogen Pseudomonas aeruginosa and its expression verified by northern blot analysis.

There appears to be two related copies of P1 sRNA in the P. aeruginosa PA01 genome and both copies appear to be located upstream of predicted glutamine synthetase genes. This sRNA appears to be conserved amongst several Pseudomonas species. P1 has a predicted Rho independent terminator at the 3′ end but the function of P1 is unknown.

See also

Pseudomonas sRNA P9
Pseudomonas sRNA P11
Pseudomonas sRNA P15
Pseudomonas sRNA P16
Pseudomonas sRNA P24
Pseudomonas sRNA P26

References

External links
 

Non-coding RNA